Erland Kops (14 January 1937 – 18 February 2017) was a badminton player from Denmark who won numerous major international singles and doubles titles from the late 1950s to the early 1970s.

Early life
Kops was born in 1937. His uncles were the boxers Ebbe and Poul Kops who both competed at the Summer Olympics. Erland Kops began to play badminton in Københavns Badminton Klub in 1948. He worked for East Asiatic Company in Thailand from 1958 to 1960.

Career
In 1958, Erland Kops brought an end to eight years of dominance of by Malayan players at the All England Badminton Championships by winning its Men's Singles event. Kops was also among the first Westerners to win major singles titles in the Far East. He combined abundant speed, power, and stamina with impressive shot-making virtuosity. Despite some disappointing results in the late rounds of Thomas Cup (men's international team) competition, Kops was clearly the dominant tournament men's singles player and one of the dominant men's doubles players of his era.

He is one of the most successful players ever in the All England Open Badminton Championships, with 11 titles between 1958 and 1967 - 7 of them in men's singles and 4 in men's doubles - breaking the Irish player Frank Devlin´s record of six titles.

Erland Kops also won 5 times the Danish Championships in men's singles and 4 in men's doubles. In the Nordic Championships, Erland Kops obtained the title 5 times in the men's singles category, 3 times in men's doubles and 2 more times in mixed doubles.

Kops played 44 national matches for Denmark from 1957-1972.

With no surprise, Erland Kops was among the first group of badminton players inducted into the World Badminton Hall of Fame in 1997, and was the first player to be inducted into the Hall of Fame of the Badminton Europe Confederation (BEC) in 2013.

As a recognition for his sporting achievements, Erland Kops has been honoured with a Knighthood from the Danish Queen, an Honorary Membership of The Danish Sports Federation, an Honorary Membership of Badminton Denmark, the Herbert Scheele Trophy from the Badminton World Federation, and being inducted to the Hall of Fame of Danish Sport, as well as being elected the second best Sportsman in Denmark of the 20th century.

All England performance 

In 1957, Erland Kops lost the final to the Malayan player Eddie B. Choong, but one year later he defeated Finn Kobberø in the final. In 1959, Tan Joe Hok - from Indonesia - won the championship, then, Erland Kops won it from 1960 to 1963. Finally, Erland Kops won it again two more times in 1965 and 1967. In men´s doubles, Erland Kops won the competition teaming up with Poul-Erik Nielsen in 1958 and together with Henning Borch from 1967 to 1969. Kops lost three finals in men's doubles - in 1961 and 1964 together with Poul-Erik Nielsen and against Jorgen Hammergaard / Finn Kobberø, and in 1965 with the Malaysian Oon Choong Jin and against Ng Boon Bee and Tan Yee Khan.
 1958: Champion - vs Finn Kobberø (Denmark)
 1960: Champion - vs Charoen Wattanasin (Thailand)
 1961: Champion - vs Finn Kobberø (Denmark)
 1962: Champion - vs Charoen Wattanasin (Thailand)
 1963: Champion - vs Channarong Ratanasaengsuang (Thailand)
 1965: Champion - vs Tan Aik Huang (Malaysia)
 1967: Champion - vs Tan Aik Huang (Malaysia)

Achievements

International tournaments 

Men's singles

Men's doubles

Mixed doubles

References

External links
Erland Kops's Profile - Badminton.dk

1937 births
2017 deaths
Danish male badminton players
Sportspeople from Copenhagen
Indian national badminton champions